Deşteptarea ('Awakening') was a trade union organization in Romania, formed in 1879 as a group of typographers withdrew from the established trade union, the General Association of All Workers of Romania.

References

Trade unions in Romania
Trade unions established in 1879